The FIFA Beach Soccer World Cup is an international beach soccer competition contested by the national teams of the member associations of FIFA, the sport's global governing body. The tournament was preceded by the Beach Soccer World Championships established in 1995 which took place every year for the next decade under the supervision of Beach Soccer Worldwide (BSWW) and its predecessors. FIFA joined hands with BSWW in 2005 to take over the organization of the competition, re-branding it as an official FIFA tournament. 

Since 2009, the tournament has taken place every two years to allow continental tournaments to flourish without the burden of the World Cup qualifiers crowding the schedule every 12 months. The growing global popularity of beach soccer resulted in FIFA's decision to move the stage of the World Cup from its native home in Brazil to other parts of the globe to capitalise on and continue to stimulate global interest. 

The current tournament format lasts over approximately 10 days and involves 16 teams initially competing in four groups of four teams. The group winners and runners-up advance to a series of knock-out stages until the champion is crowned. The losing semi-finalists play each other in a play-off match to determine the third and fourth-placed teams.

The first edition held outside Brazil was in 2008 in Marseille, France. The most recent edition in 2021 was held in Moscow, Russia, and crowned the hosts, playing as RFU, as champions for the third time – after defeating Japan 5–2 in the final.

History
The first world cup of beach soccer was held in Brazil, in 1995, organised by the precursors to the modern-day founders of the standardised rules, Beach Soccer Worldwide, held under the title Beach Soccer World Championships. The last edition took place in 2004.

In 2005, FIFA paired up with BSWW to co-organise a new world cup competition under FIFA's name. They kept the tradition of holding the world cup in Rio de Janeiro and continued to allow 12 teams to participate, following on from the 2004 competition. It was Eric Cantona's France that won the competition after beating Portugal on penalties in the final.
The tournament was deemed a "major success" and therefore, for the 2006 competition and beyond, FIFA decided to standardise the participants to 16 countries. It was then that the FIFA Beach Soccer World Cup qualifiers were also established that would take place throughout the year. 

By the end of the 2007 World Cup, the tournament had become more popular, with the FIFA board taking over the competition, driving more countries to recognize beach soccer as a "major" sport. FIFA decided to have a change of venue. It was voted to extend the sport's popularity that the 2008 World Cup would take place in Marseille, France, and the 2009 World Cup would take place in Dubai, United Arab Emirates. These tournaments would be the first to take place outside Brazil.
The 2008 competition was the first time that Brazil would have to qualify for the tournament since they weren't the hosts. The 2009 World Cup is the Beach Soccer World Cup's 15th birthday, with Brazil continuing their dominance.

Before the final of the 2009 World Cup, FIFA announced that a new format would see the World Cup now take place every two years, starting from the 2011 World Cup. FIFA justified the decision by stating that they wanted Confederations to have more time to develop the sport, therefore allowing a year in between World Cups for Confederations to organise their own local tournaments. This was a mutual decision between the confederations and FIFA. In March 2010 FIFA confirmed that the 2011 World Cup would take place in Italy and the 2013 World Cup would take place in Tahiti.

In 2013, FIFA extended the FIFA Champions Badge to the winners of the competition, where it was won by Russia.

Qualification
Following the inaugural FIFA tournament in 2005, the number of teams at the finals was increased by FIFA to a record 16 and so the governing body along with BSWW met with individual confederations to set up a standard qualifying process for each world cup by establishing championships for each confederation. The winners of these championships would be crowned the best team in the region, "promoting regional competitiveness, and most importantly act as a consistent method of qualification to the World Cup for the best teams of each confederation. This would also help increase the sport's awareness across the globe and make sure all confederations were represented at the finals at every following World Cup, unlike in the past."

Besides Europe who continued to use the Euro Beach Soccer League as the method of World Cup qualification until 2008, all other confederations hosted their first championships in 2006 in view of the finals later that year.

Attendance 
The allocation of World Cup spots and the number of teams that qualify from their regional championship to the World Cup was decided by FIFA in 2006 as follows:

 As part of the Euro Beach Soccer League

The host country's confederation loses one qualification spot. I.e. since the 2015 World Cup was held in Portugal, they automatically qualified taking up one of the five European spots. Therefore, in the 2015 UEFA qualifiers, only four teams qualified from the championships to join the hosts making the total of five European nations.

As shown in the table, attendance of nations in qualification tournaments generally continues to rise year on year; the total global number of participants has nearly doubled since 2006.

Despite being the premier tournament in most regions, since the primary objective is to qualify to the World Cup, on some occasions teams have not participated due to qualifying to the finals automatically as hosts such as Brazil deferring from the 2007 CONMBEBOL Beach Soccer Championship and Tahiti in the 2013 OFC Beach Soccer Championship.

Results

Teams reaching the top four
Overall, 14 of the 39 nations who have ever competed have made a top four finish; four have won the title. 

Brazil are the most successful nation, with five wins. Since the start of the 2010s, their hold on the title has become less apparent, with four of their five successes coming in the 2000s. They are followed by Russia with three titles, Portugal with two titles and France with one title. Brazil and Portugal are the only teams to win a world title before and after FIFA began sanctioning the sport.

Brazil were the only nation to finish in the final four of every tournament until 2015 when they finished in fifth place. They are also the only country that never miss any editions.

Key
* = Hosts

By confederation

Tournament appearances 

Since the tournament's establishment in 2005, as of the 2021 World Cup, 39 countries have participated over the 11 competitions. Two countries have participated in all World Cups, which are Brazil and Japan. European teams have dominated in unique qualifiers by continent, since 10 of the 39 countries have been from Europe, double that of any other.

Eight countries who appeared in the precursor championships have failed to appear in a FIFA World Cup; Peru (5) appeared in the most competitions without yet attending a FIFA controlled World Cup. Meanwhile, Senegal (8) have appeared in the most FIFA sanctioned tournaments without having ever appeared in the old World Championships before 2005.

Attendance
In all tournaments, one venue was used to host all matches, with the exception of 2009, when two venues were used.

See also
 FIFA Beach Soccer World Cup records and statistics

Notes

References

External links
History, FIFA.com 
The Beach Soccer Championships,  BeachsoccerUSA.org 
RSSSF.com Beach Soccer Championships, RSSSF.com 

 
World Cup
Beach soccer
Beach soccer
Recurring sporting events established in 2005